Hugh Mackay may refer to:

 Hugh Mackay (general) (c. 1640–1692), Scottish general who served during the Revolution of 1688
 Hugh Mackay of Bighouse, 18th century Scottish soldier
 Hugh Mackay, 14th Lord Reay (1937–2013), member of the British House of Lords
 Hugh Mackay (Quebec politician) (1832–1890), businessperson and politician in Quebec
 Hugh Mackay (footballer) (1867–?), English footballer
 Hugh Mackay (social researcher) (born 1938), Australian social researcher
 Hugh Mackay (Charlotte County, New Brunswick politician) (died 1848), politician in New Brunswick
 Hugh Mackay (Saint John County, New Brunswick politician) (1887–1957), Canadian politician
 Hugh MacKay (Nova Scotia politician), Canadian politician
 Hugh Colin MacKay, Canadian Surgeon General

See also
 Hugh McKay (disambiguation)